MGHS may refer to:
 Match Game-Hollywood Squares Hour, an American television game show

Schools 
 Mac.Robertson Girls' High School, Melbourne, Victoria, Australia
 Madison-Grant High School, Fairmount, Indiana, United States
 Maitland Grossmann High School, East Maitland, New South Wales, Australia
 Marysville Getchell High School, Marysville, Washington, United States
 Mohammadpur Government High School, Dhaka, Bangladesh
 Morgan Girls High School, Narayanganj, Bangladesh
 Monona Grove High School, Monona, Wisconsin, United States
 Mount Graham High School, Stafford, Arizona, United States

Transportation
 MG HS, a compact crossover model